
Gmina Wicko is a rural gmina (administrative district) in Lębork County, Pomeranian Voivodeship, in northern Poland.

Villages
Gmina Wicko contains the villages and settlements of Bargędzino, Białogarda, Bieśno, Cegielnia Charbrowska, Charbrowo, Charbrowski Bór, Dychlino, Dymnica, Gąska, Gęś, Górka, Komaszewo, Kopaniewo, Krakulice, Łebieniec, Lucin, Maszewko, Nieznachowo, Nowęcin, Podróże, Poraj, Przybrzeże, Roszczyce, Sądowo, Sarbsk, Skarszewo, Steknica, Strzeszewo, Szczenurze, Szczenurze-Kolonia, Ulinia, Wicko, Wojciechowo, Wrzeście, Wrześcienko, Zachacie, Żarnowska and Zdrzewno.

Neighbouring gminas
Gmina Wicko is bordered by the town of Łeba and by the gminas of Choczewo, Główczyce, Nowa Wieś Lęborska and Smołdzino.

Prior to World War II this area was in the German State of Prussia and Wicko was named Vietzig.

References
Polish official population figures 2006

Wicko
Lębork County